Renée Petropoulos is a contemporary artist who currently lives and works in Venice, California.

Petropoulos was born in Los Angeles and received her B.A. in Art History from the University of California, Los Angeles in 1974 and then her M.A. in Photography and Video, 1977, and her M.F.A. in Studio Art, 1979- both from UCLA. Petropoulos is represented by Rosamund Felsen Gallery in Santa Monica, California and is a professor at Otis College of Art and Design in the Graduate Fine Arts, Graduate Public Practice and Graduate Graphic Design departments.

Exhibitions 
 "Proposal for a Pavilion", 2014. LAMOA / Los Angeles, CA, 2014
 "Freeway Studies #1: This Side of the 405," Ben Maltz Gallery at Otis College of Art and Design, Los Angeles, CA, 2013
 "Figures and Grounds: Approaches to Abstraction," Arts Club of Chicago, Chicago, IL, 2012
 "Telephone," Torrance Art Museum, Torrance, CA, 2011
 "Homage'" solo exhibition at Rosamund Felsen Gallery, Santa Monica, CA, 2009
 "(dis)concert ," Steve Turner Contemporary, Los Angeles, CA, 2008
 "LA - A Select Survey of Art from Los Angeles," Center for Contemporary Art Sacramento, Sacramento, CA, 2008
 Renée Petropoulos, solo exhibition at Rosamund Felsen Gallery, Santa Monica, CA, 2007
 "LACE Annual Benefit," Los Angeles Contemporary Exhibitions, Los Angeles, CA, 2007
 "Social Arrangements'" solo exhibition at Rosamund Felsen Gallery, Santa Monica, CA, 2007
 "Sugartown," Elizabeth Dee Gallery, New York City, NY, 2005
 "100 Artists See God," Virginia Museum of Contemporary Art (MOCA), Virginia Beach, VA, 2005, and Institute of Contemporary Arts London, London (England), 2004. Catalog. Review in e-flux.
 "Trespassing: Houses X Artists," Palm Springs Art Museum, Palm Springs, CA, The Art Museum of the University of Houston, Houston, TX, 2004, and University of South Florida Contemporary Art Museum, Tampa, FL, 2003.
 "Structures of Knowledge," RAID Projects, Los Angeles, CA, 2001
 "Urban Hymns," The Luckman Fine Arts Complex, Los Angeles, CA, 2000
 "The Stroke: An Overview of Contemporary Painting," Exit Art, New York City, NY (1999-2012)
 "Tangles," Ben Maltz Gallery at Otis College of Art and Design, Los Angeles, CA, 1996
 "Excavations," Ben Maltz Gallery at Otis College of Art and Design, Los Angeles, CA, 1998

Public art 

Renée Petropoulos has made public artworks in Los Angeles and elsewhere. Among her public art commissions are a large painted ceiling at the downtown Los Angeles Public Library and a series of sculptures in Culver City, a collaborative project for the Municipal Services Building in downtown Philadelphia, and medallions for the guideway Douglas St/Rosecrans Ave. station  of the Metro Green Line in El Segundo, California.

Further reading 
 Art Slant Profile
  Artist Profile, Los Angeles County Metropolitan Transportation Authority (Metro) 
 L.A. Times article: "Artistry in the Round: Renee Petropoulos Explores the Forms, Functions of Wreaths in her Current Exhibition"
 "Review: Renee Petropoulos at Rosamund Felsen Gallery," Los Angeles Times Blog, February 27, 2009.
 "Flagging Interest: Renée Petropoulos at Rosamund Felsen Gallery." L.A. Weekly, Feb 25 2009.
 "Renee Petropoulos: Rosamund Felsen Gallery," by Chris Kraus, Artforum International Vol. 46, No. 3, November 2007.

Living people
American contemporary artists
American women artists
Otis College of Art and Design faculty
Artists from Los Angeles
Year of birth missing (living people)
University of California, Los Angeles alumni
People from Venice, Los Angeles
American women academics
21st-century American women